In barbershop music, a tag is a dramatic variation put in the last section of the song.  It is roughly analogical to a coda in classical music.

Tags are characterized by heightening the dramatic tension of the song, frequently including a hanger or sustained note against which the other singers carry the rhythm.  In addition, good tags can be sung as short, stand-alone works.  Tags may be soft and tender but are typically characterized by loud, "paint-peeling", ringing chords.  According to the competition rules of the Barbershop Harmony Society, every song entered for a competition must have a tag.

References

External links
 BarbershopTags.com
 DNS Tags.com

Barbershop music
Musical terminology